The All-Ireland Senior Hurling Championship of 1992 was the 106th staging of Ireland's premier hurling knock-out competition. Kilkenny won the championship, beating Cork 3-10 to 1-12 in the final at Croke Park, Dublin.

The championship

Participating counties

Format

Leinster Championship

Quarter-final: (1 match) This is a lone match between the first two teams drawn from the province of Leinster.  One team is  eliminated at this stage, while the winners advance to the semi-finals.

Semi-finals: (2 matches) The winners of the lone quarter-final join three other Leinster teams to make up the semi-final pairings.  Two teams are eliminated at this stage, while two teams advance to the final.

Final: (1 match) The winners of the two semi-finals contest this game.  One team is eliminated at this stage, while the winners advance to the All-Ireland semi-final.

Ulster Championship
Semi-final: (1 match) This is a lone match between the first two teams drawn from the province of Ulster.  One team is  eliminated at this stage, while the winners advance to the final.

Final: (1 match) The winners of the lone quarter-final join another Ulster team to contest this game.  One team is eliminated at this stage, while the winners advance to the All-Ireland semi-final.

Munster Championship
Quarter-final: (2 matches) These are two lone matches between the first four teams drawn from the province of Munster.  Two teams are eliminated at this stage, while two teams advance to the semi-finals.

Semi-finals: (2 matches) The winners of the two quarter-finals join the other two Munster teams to make up the semi-final pairings.  Two teams are eliminated at this stage, while two teams advance to the final.

Final: (1 match) The winners of the two semi-finals contest this game.  One team is eliminated at this stage, while the winners advance to the All-Ireland semi-final.

All-Ireland Championship
Quarter-final: (1 match) This is a lone match between Galway and the All-Ireland 'B' champions.  One team is eliminated at this stage, while the winners advance to the All-Ireland semi-final where they play the Leinster champions.

Semi-finals: (2 matches) The Munster and Leinster champions will play the winners of the lone quarter-final and the Ulster champions.  The Munster and Leinster winners will be in opposite semi-finals.  Two teams are eliminated at this stage, while the two winnerss advance to the All-Ireland final.

Final: (1 match) The two semi-final winners will contest the All-Ireland final.

Fixtures

Leinster Senior Hurling Championship

Munster Senior Hurling Championship

Ulster Senior Hurling Championship

All-Ireland Senior Hurling Championship

Top scorers

Season

Single game

References
 Corry, Eoghan, The GAA Book of Lists (Hodder Headline Ireland, 2005).
 Donegan, Des, The Complete Handbook of Gaelic Games (DBA Publications Limited, 2005).

External links
All-Ireland Senior Hurling Championship 1992 Results

See also

1992
All-Ireland Senior Hurling Championship